Evi Van Acker (born 23 September 1985) is a Belgian professional sailor. She has a Bachelor in Chemistry and is currently studying for a Master in bio-engineering.

Career
Van Acker started sailing at age 7 in an Optimist dinghy and soon started on the youth program of the Royal Belgian Sailing Club. In 1998 she became European champion in the Optimist class. In 2000, she transferred to the Europe class and placed 17th in the 2003 World Championship. Having transferred to the Laser Radial, she became European champion in 2006, 2007 and 2011 and became second in the 2011 World Championship.

She went on to compete in the 2008 Olympic Sailing Competition finishing 8th in the Women's Singlehanded Class the Laser Radial.

On 6 August 2012 she won the bronze medal in the 2012 Olympic Sailing Competition in the Laser Radial class, behind Xu Lijia of China and Marit Bouwmeester of the Netherlands.

She was shortlisted in 2007 by the International Sailing Federation for the ISAF World Sailor of the Year Awards.

References

External links
 
 
 
 
 

1985 births
Living people
Sailors at the 2008 Summer Olympics – Laser Radial
Sailors at the 2012 Summer Olympics – Laser Radial
Olympic sailors of Belgium
Belgian female sailors (sport)
Olympic bronze medalists for Belgium
Olympic medalists in sailing
Medalists at the 2012 Summer Olympics
Sailors at the 2016 Summer Olympics – Laser Radial
21st-century Belgian women